Spring Voices is a 1955 Soviet musical film directed by Sergei Gurov and Eldar Ryazanov. First Soviet experimental widescreen revue film.

Plot 
A group of students of a vocational school create a TV that demonstrates performances of various creative teams and presents it at the All-Union show of amateur art.

Cast
 Vladimir Salnikov as Vanya (as Volodya Salnikov)
 Nadezhda Rumyantseva as Nina
 Tigran Davydov as Vasya
 Sergei Gurov as episode
 Eldar Ryazanov as episode

References

External links 
  

1955 films
1950s Russian-language films
Soviet musical films
1955 musical films
Mosfilm films
Films directed by Eldar Ryazanov
1955 directorial debut films
Soviet teen films
Soviet black-and-white films